Auer+Weber+Assoziierte is a German architecture firm, founded and headquartered in Stuttgart and Munich, Germany in 1980. The founders are Fritz Auer (born 24 June 1933), and Carlo Weber (6 April 1934-15 May 2014).

History
The architect's office "Auer+Weber" was established in 1980 by Fritz Auer and Carlo Weber, emerged from Behnisch & Partner, to which both architects belonged between 1966 and 1979. Meantime, it was also named as "Auer+Weber+Partners" (1991-2001) and "Auer+Weber+Architects" (2001-2005). From spring 2006, the office was known under the name of Auer+Weber+Associates Ltd.. Today, the office has about 80 employees.

Selected Projects

Completed
1983 Kurgast Center in Bad Salzuflen, Nordrhein-Westfalen, Germany
1986 Foster home in Lemgo, North Rhine-Westphalia, Germany
1989 Cafeteria in Ulm University
1991 Administration buildings in Munich Airport, Germany
1991 Administration buildings of public services in Reutlingen, Baden-Württemberg, Germany
1994 Theater in Hof (Saale), Bavaria, Germany
1996 Block of offices Prisma in Frankfurt a.M., Germany
1998 Zeppelin Carré in Stuttgart, Germany
1998 Extension and reconstruction of the city theater in Recklinghausen, Germany
2001 Reconstruction of Ruhrfestspielhaus in Recklinghausen, Germany 
2001 German State Central Bank in  Sachsen-Anhalt, Halberstadt, Germany
2001 Canopy of central station plaza in Heilbronn, Baden-Württemberg, Germany
2003 Hotel ESO Cerro Paranal, Chile
2005 Commendation exhibition building "Brühlsche Terrasse" in Dresden, Germany
2005 solarCity Linz, Austria
2006 Würzburg Central Station, Germany
2013 ESO Headquarters Extension, Garching, Germany

Current

Olympiahalle in Munich additions and alterations, Germany (approx. 2008)
Campus Martinsried, Munich, Germany (approx. 2008)
Facade Haerder-Center Lübeck, Germany (approx. 2008)
Munich Central Bus Station, Germany (approx. 2009)
Centre des Sports Belair, Luxembourg (approx. 2009)
Botanical Garden "Chenshan", Shanghai, China (approx. 2009)
Seniors Residence, Regensburg, Germany (approx. 2010)

Awards

1972 I.C.P. Award of Honor, Hugo Häring Award*
1972 Architecture Award from the German Association of Architects (BDA)*
1981 International Architecture Award from the UIA (International Union of Architects), Auguste Perret Award*Project: Sports grounds and buildings for the Olympic Games 1972 in Munich, Germany
1989 German Architecture AwardProject: Landratsamt in Starnberg, Germany
1991 Fritz Schumacher Award
1991 German critics' Architecture AwardProject: German Pavilion, Seville Expo '92, Spain
1995 German Architecture Award, official recognition Project: Theater in Hof, Germany
2001 German Architecture AwardProject: Ruhrfestspielhaus in Recklinghausen, Germany
2007 German Architecture AwardProject: Commendation exhibition building "Brühlsche Terrasse" in Dresden, Germany
 2005 LEAF Award, "Best Environmentally Sustainable Project"Project: solarCity Center Linz- Pichling, Austria
 2004 LEAF Award, category "New Build"+"Overall" Project: Hotel ESO Cerro Paranal, Chile
 * as partners in Behnisch & Partner

References

1993 "Auer+Weber, Positions and Projects"- Callwey Publishers, Munich
2003 "Auer+Weber+Architekten Arbeiten 1980-2003 Works", Birkhäuser Publishers, Basel

External links 

Auer+Weber+Assoziierte - Homepage of AWA
Auer+Weber+Assoziierte Details

 
Architecture firms of Germany
Companies based in Stuttgart
Companies based in Munich